DisCina was a French film production and distribution company established in 1938 by Michel Safra and André Paulvé. It reached its peak during the 1940s and early 1950s, remaining active during the Occupation of France.

It also operated a distribution company in the United States to release its French films on the American art house market.

Selected filmography

 Conflict (1938)
 Gibraltar (1938)
 Monsieur Coccinelle (1938)
 Angelica (1939)
 La Loi du Nord (1939)
 Serge Panine (1939)
 The Fatted Calf (1939)
 Personal Column (1939)
 Beating Heart (1940)
 Thunder Over Paris (1940)
 First Ball (1941)
 Carmen (1942)
 The Murderer is Afraid at Night (1942)
 Summer Light (1943)
 The Eternal Return (1943)
 The Mysteries of Paris (1943)
 The Bellman (1945)
 Box of Dreams (1945)
 Mademoiselle X (1945)
 Father Goriot (1945)
 Beauty and the Beast (1946)
 Sylvie and the Ghost (1946)
 Rendezvous in Paris (1947)
 The Sharks of Gibraltar (1947)
 The Great Dawn (1947)
 Ruy Blas (1948)
 Rocambole (1948)
 The Revenge of Baccarat (1948)
 The Charterhouse of Parma (1948)
 White Paws (1949)
 All Roads Lead to Rome (1949)
 The Dancer of Marrakesh (1949)
 The King (1949)
 Manèges (1950)
 Lady Paname (1950)
 Orpheus (1950)
 The Red Needle (1951)
 My Seal and Them (1951)
 The Night Is My Kingdom (1951)
 Great Man (1951)
 Casque d'Or (1952)
 Alone in the World (1952)
 Les Vacances de Monsieur Hulot (1953)
 The Merchant of Venice (1953)
 The Big Flag (1954)
 Mourez, nous ferons le reste (1954)
 The Great Bulwark (1954)

References

Bibliography
 Crisp, C.G. The Classic French Cinema, 1930-1960. Indiana University Press, 1993 
 Slide, Anthony. The New Historical Dictionary of the American Film Industry. Routledge, 2014.

French film studios
Film production companies of France
Film distributors of France